The Hite Crossing Bridge is an  arch bridge that carries Utah State Route 95 across the Colorado River northwest of Blanding, Utah, United States. The bridge is near Hite Marina on Lake Powell, and a small airstrip is immediately adjacent to the north side of the bridge.

History
The Colorado River served as a major barrier to early settlers and explorers of the region. This ford, named "Dandy Crossing", served as one of the few locations in the region where travelers could cross the Colorado River. The settlement that formed at the crossing location took the name of its founder, Hite. In 1946, a settler named Arthur Chaffin constructed an automobile ferry using an old car engine and a thick steel cable to hold it in place. The ferry operated for 20 years, before the rising waters of Lake Powell inundated the settlement of Hite.

The bridge was completed as part of the realignment of State Route 95, which was approved in 1962 due to the construction of Glen Canyon Dam and Lake Powell's subsequent flooding of the original roadway alignment and the original river crossing in Hite. The bridge was designed by David Sargent and was advertised for bids on June 29, 1963 at a cost of approximately US$3 million (equivalent to $ million in  dollars). The bridge was dedicated on June 3, 1966.

References

External links

Lake Powell
Transportation in Garfield County, Utah
Transportation in San Juan County, Utah
Glen Canyon National Recreation Area
Road bridges in Utah
Bridges over the Colorado River
Through arch bridges in the United States
Steel bridges in the United States
Buildings and structures in Garfield County, Utah
Buildings and structures in San Juan County, Utah
1966 establishments in Utah
Bridges completed in 1966